Michael Melton McClendon (born April 3, 1985) is a former professional baseball pitcher. He played in Major League Baseball (MLB) for the Milwaukee Brewers from 2010-2012.

Career

Milwaukee Brewers
McClendon was drafted by the Brewers in the 10th round of the 2006 amateur entry draft out of Seminole State College of Florida in Sanford, FL after two seasons under head coach Mike Nicholson.  In 2006, he made his professional debut for the Rookie League Helena Brewers. In 2007, he was promoted to the Class A West Virginia Power, and then the Class A-Advanced Brevard County Manatees. McClendon played the entire 2008 season with the Manatees. In 2009, he was promoted to the Double-A Huntsville Stars. He played the majority of the 2010 season with Huntsville and the Triple-A Nashville Sounds. On August 12, he was called up to Milwaukee to replace reliever LaTroy Hawkins who was placed on the disabled list. He made his major league debut on August 14, pitching three scoreless innings against the Colorado Rockies, becoming the first ever Brewers pitcher to start a career with at least three perfect innings.

Colorado Rockies
On June 3, 2014, McClendon signed a minor league deal with the Colorado Rockies.

Brother Elephants
McClendon signed with the Brother Elephants of the Chinese Professional Baseball League for the 2015 season.

York Revolution
On April 8, 2016, McClendon signed with the York Revolution of the Atlantic League of Professional Baseball. He became a free agent after the 2016 season.

References

External links

1985 births
Living people
Baseball players from Arlington, Texas
Milwaukee Brewers players
Bishop Moore High School alumni
Seminole State Raiders baseball players
Helena Brewers players
West Virginia Power players
Brevard County Manatees players
Huntsville Stars players
Nashville Sounds players
Colorado Springs Sky Sox players
York Revolution players
Major League Baseball pitchers
Surprise Rafters players
Perth Heat players
American expatriate baseball players in Australia